In topology, Urysohn's lemma is a lemma that states that a topological space is normal if and only if any two disjoint closed subsets can be separated by a continuous function.

Urysohn's lemma is commonly used to construct continuous functions with various properties on normal spaces. It is widely applicable since all metric spaces and all compact Hausdorff spaces are normal. The lemma is generalised by (and usually used in the proof of) the Tietze extension theorem.

The lemma is named after the mathematician Pavel Samuilovich Urysohn.

Discussion

A normal space is a topological space in which any two disjoint closed sets can be separated by neighbourhoods. Urysohn's lemma states that a topological space is normal if and only if any two disjoint closed sets can be separated by a continuous function.

Urysohn's lemma has led to the formulation of other topological properties such as the 'Tychonoff property' and 'completely Hausdorff spaces'. For example, a corollary of the lemma is that normal T1 spaces are Tychonoff.

Formal Statement

Sketch of proof

The procedure is an entirely straightforward application of the definition of normality (once one draws some figures representing the first few steps in the induction described below to see what is going on), beginning with two disjoint closed sets. The  part of the proof is the indexing of the open sets thus constructed by dyadic fractions.

For every dyadic fraction , we are going to construct an open subset  of  such that:
Once we have these sets, we define  if  for any ; otherwise  for every , where  denotes the infimum. Using the fact that the dyadic rationals are dense, it is then not too hard to show that  is continuous and has the property  and 

In order to construct the sets , we actually do a little bit more: we construct sets  and  such that

This construction proceeds by mathematical induction.

The Mizar project has completely formalised and automatically checked a proof of Urysohn's lemma in the URYSOHN3 file.

See also

Notes

References

External links

 
 Mizar system proof: http://mizar.org/version/current/html/urysohn3.html#T20

Articles containing proofs
Theory of continuous functions
Lemmas
Separation axioms
Theorems in topology